Zhou Shoujuan 周瘦鵑 (30 June 1895 – 11 August 1968), born Zhou Zufu, courtesy name Guoxian, also known by his English name Eric Chow, was a Chinese novelist, screenwriter, literary editor, and English–to-Chinese literary translator.

Career 
From 1911 to 1947, as a translator, Zhou has translated around 200 short stories from English into the Chinese language. Zhou has introduced the works of Daniel Defoe, Charles Dickens, Mark Twain, Washington Irving, Harriet Beecher Stowe and many others to Chinese readers. 
In September 1913, Zhou was the editor of Unfettered Talk, a supplement of Shenbao.
Zhou wrote hundreds of stories and some film scripts. 
As an editor, Zhou edited magazines including "Weekly" weekly magazine, Dadong Bookstore "Half Moon" magazine (later renamed "Violet" and "New Family"), "Purple Orchid", and "Liangyou pictorial".

Personal life 
During the Chinese Cultural Revolution and on August 11, 1968, Zhou committed suicide by jumping into a well hours after a struggle session against him.

Works translated into English

Filmography 
Zhou Shoujuan wrote the screenplays for these films:

See also 
 Mandarin Ducks and Butterflies

References

External links 
 Chan Li's analysis at jiaotongbakercentre.org

1895 births
1968 suicides
Writers from Suzhou
Suicides during the Cultural Revolution
Screenwriters from Jiangsu
Chinese male short story writers
20th-century Chinese writers
Literary editors
English–Chinese translators
Literary translators
20th-century Chinese translators
Republic of China translators
Republic of China short story writers
Short story writers from Jiangsu
20th-century screenwriters
Suicides by jumping in China
Suicides in the People's Republic of China